Witold Przykucki (4 March 1907 – 14 May 1940) was a Polish footballer. He played in one match for the Poland national football team in 1928.

References

External links
 

1907 births
1940 deaths
Polish footballers
Poland international footballers
Place of birth missing
Association footballers not categorized by position